Carsten Bo Eriksen alias MBD73 which is short for My Beautiful Decay 1973 (born 2 October 1973 in Copenhagen, Denmark) is a Danish 21st-century composer and artist.

Biography
Carsten Bo Eriksen (a.k.a. MBD73) is a prize-winning and award-nominated composer and artist. He was educated at the Royal Academy of Music as a composer (1997-2003), pupil of Professor Ib Nørholm, Ivar Frounberg and Hans Abrahamsen. As a painter he is self-taught. He had his debut from the extended studies program in composition in 2003. Furthermore, he has studied at Berklee College of Music, Massachusetts, US. And has studied the Balinese gamelan music in Ubud, Bali, Indonesia, with the musician Pak Tama. In 2004 he was granted by the Danish Arts Foundation with a three-year working grant.

Music
Carsten Bo Eriksen (a.k.a. MBD73) finds his inspiration in the European and American minimalism, as well as electronica, alt.classical or indie-classical/post-classical and post-rock music. He is among the very few composers in Denmark with strong roots in minimalism.

Rock albums
 Skin, Melonheads Sony music / Tame music (2002)

Classical albums
 Nordlys, DaCapo Records / Naxos (2002)

Notes

References
 Naxos.com. Composer biography; Eriksen, Carsten Bo
 Pryn, Christine. "Hvis der er noget, jeg ikke kan, så gør jeg det bare alligevel" Dansk Musik Tidsskrift; 2003-2004 - 02, page 52-55 (in Danish)

1973 births
20th-century classical composers
21st-century classical composers
Danish classical composers
Danish male classical composers
Living people
Royal Danish Academy of Music alumni
20th-century Danish male musicians
21st-century male musicians